Delhi has been, since historical times, a favored destination for shoppers. From traditional bazaars to modern-day malls, Delhi has everything to offer to a customer. Delhi's street markets are reported to provide a greater turnover as compared to malls. Since not everyone can afford to shop at malls or branded stores, most residents swear by the street markets. The quality of goods varies from market to market.

Below is a list of famous shopping markets and malls in and around Delhi.

2016.

Retail markets
 Connaught Place, including Janpath and Palika Bazaar.
 Chandni Chowk - A market running since the 17th century.
 Karol Bagh
 Paharganj
 Sarojini Nagar
 Khan Market - Most expensive retail location in India, in terms of per sq feet rental.
 Lajpat Nagar
 Dilli Haat, INA and Pitampura - Government-run emporiums showcasing a rotating cast of regional artists and their crafts, such as bamboo & cane jewelry, handcarved wooden articles and papier-mache animals.
 Hauz Khas Village Market, 
 South Extension
 Nehru Place
 Daryaganj
 Gandhi Nagar
 Rajouri Garden
 Tilak Nagar Central Market
 Rani Bagh
 Kohat Pitampura
 Kamla Nagar

Wholesale markets
 Gandhi Nagar, Delhi
 Okhla Mandi
 Mehrauli
 Chandni Chowk
 Khari Baoli
 Ghanta Ghar
 Bhajanpura

Shopping malls

Delhi
Ansal Plaza, Hudco Place
West Gate Mall
Select Citywalk, Saket

Noida
 DLF Mall of India
 The Grand Venice Mall

See also
List of shopping malls in India

References

Economy of Delhi
Retail markets in India
Retail markets in Delhi